The 2014 Men's Oceania Handball Challenge Trophy was held in Ipswich, Queensland, Australia between December 7 and 17, 2010.

The competition participants were defending champions from 1998 and host Australia, and 1998 runners up New Zealand. New to the championship were Vanuatu, Solomon Islands, and Samoa. Vanuatu arrived late due to Visa problems and had to forfeit their first two games.

Hosts Australia were the winners and undefeated all tournament beating New Zealand in the final. Third was Vanuatu over Cook Islands. Fifth was Samoa over Solomon Islands.

Results

Group results

Semi finals

Fifth place game

Third place game

Final

Rankings

References

 Draw & Rankings on OCHF webpage
 Media watch on OCHF webpage
 Team messages on OCHF webpage
 Violi Calvert blog on OCHF webpage
 Men's 2010 results archive
 Men's 2010 report on NSWHF webpage
 Ipswich secures Oceania trophy. Ipswich Times, 2 Dec 2010.

Oceania Handball Challenge Trophy
Oceania Handball Challenge Trophy
2010 Oceania Handball Challenge Trophy
2010 in Australian sport